Joel Edward Philip Ward (born 29 October 1989) is an English professional footballer who plays as a defender for  club Crystal Palace. His usual position is right-back but he can also play at left-back, centre-back, and in midfield.

Club career

Portsmouth

Ward started his footballing career with local youth team East Lodge and signed a professional contract with Portsmouth in July 2008 after spending two years in the Academy and Reserves.

AFC Bournemouth (loan)
The following month, he signed a one-year loan deal with AFC Bournemouth to gain first team experience. Ward soon made his debut in a League Cup match against Cardiff City on 12 August, playing the full 90 minutes as Cardiff ran out 2–1 winners. His League Two debut came later that week on 16 August 2008 in an away draw with Aldershot Town. As the season progressed, Ward continued to appear in defence for the Cherries and he gained the first yellow and red cards of his career on 18 October in a 4–1 away defeat to Shrewsbury Town, eventually being sent off for two bookable offences. However, his form meant that he returned to the side soon afterwards, making his Football League Trophy and FA Cup debuts: a home defeat by Colchester United and a home win against Bristol Rovers on 4 and 8 November respectively. He scored his first and only Bournemouth goal in a 4–0 win over Morecambe on 2 May 2009.

Return to Portsmouth
On 26 August 2009, Ward made his Portsmouth debut as a centre-back against Hereford United in the League Cup, before making his Premier League debut on 14 April 2010 against Wigan Athletic, playing from start to finish at left-back as the game finished goalless. Ward played in most of Pompeys remaining league matches that season and remained at Fratton Park in the summer even after they were relegated to the Championship. He began the new season as first-choice right-back, but later lost his starting berth to Wolverhampton Wanderers loanee Greg Halford. Ward scored his first Portsmouth goal in a 3–2 defeat to Doncaster Rovers on 13 November 2010.

Starting with their 2–0 away victory over Doncaster Rovers on 12 February 2011, a game in which he scored, Ward played as an attacking midfielder in Portsmouth's new 4–2–3–1 formation and earned praise from manager Steve Cotterill who was quoted as saying: "Joel Ward has got great energy and did well in that role in the centre in midfield in behind the striker."Football-Lineups.com (Portsmouth Championship lineups from 19 February to 8 March 2011)
On 18 December 2011, Ward scored the equaliser in the South Coast derby against Southampton which finished 1–1.

Crystal Palace
On 28 May 2012, Ward completed his move to Crystal Palace for £400,000 on a four-year deal. He made his debut on 14 August 2012, in a 2–1 win against Exeter City in the League Cup. He made his league debut four days later in a home game against Watford. He won promotion with Crystal Palace after clearing a shot off the line during the last minute of injury time against the same opponents in the 2013 Championship play-off final. Ward scored his first goal for Crystal Palace in a 3–1 home win against Queens Park Rangers on 14 March 2015.

On 15 April 2015, Ward signed a new three-and-a-half-year contract, keeping him at the Selhurst Park side until the summer of 2018. As of May 2016, Ward currently holds the record for most Premier League appearances for a Crystal Palace player. He reached the hundred milestone in a 1–1 draw away to Arsenal on 17 April 2016.

On 2 July 2018, Ward signed a new three-year deal, which will keep him at the club until the summer of 2021.

In July 2021, Ward signed a two-year contract extension, until 2023.

Personal life
Ward is currently involved with helping and supporting local charity Faith and Football, which was set up by former Pompey defender Linvoy Primus. He attended the Bourne Community College in Southbourne and Bishop Luffa School in Chichester. Ward is a Christian and kneels down on the pitch to pray before each match. On 20 April 2014, Ward returned to his home church for an interview about how he brings his Christian faith to his job as a footballer. He currently resides in London.

Position versatility
Ward operated mainly as a central defender at the start of his professional career. He proved his versatility in the 2010–11 season with Steve Cotterill deploying him as a right-back at the start of the season, and also played him as a central midfielder, right midfielder and as an attacking midfielder. Whilst at Palace, he has often filled in at left back, most notably in the 2013–14 and 2014–15 seasons.

Career statistics

HonoursCrystal Palace'
Football League Championship play-offs: 2013
FA Cup runner-up: 2015–16

References

External links
Joel Ward profile at Crystal Palace
Joel Ward profile at AFCB.co.uk

1989 births
Living people
People from Emsworth
English footballers
Association football defenders
Portsmouth F.C. players
AFC Bournemouth players
Crystal Palace F.C. players
Premier League players
English Football League players
English Christians
People educated at Bishop Luffa School
FA Cup Final players